John Wallwork may refer to:
 John Wallwork (aviator)
 John Wallwork (surgeon)